Smile Jamaica is a Jamaican-produced television show that is broadcast on Television Jamaica (TVJ) on weekdays from 6:00 am – 8:30 am (Jamaican time). It is the premier morning show for the network providing programming of news, information and entertainment.

References

External links 
Smile Jamaica official page

Jamaican television series
Television talk shows
Television Jamaica original programming